Andre Baccellia (born January 7, 1997) is an American football wide receiver for the Arizona Cardinals of the National Football League (NFL).

Early life and education
Baccellia was born on January 7, 1997, in Thousand Oaks, California. He attended high school there for Westlake, playing football and track. As a junior in high school, Baccellia caught 46 passes for 954 yards and 11 touchdowns, helping his team achieve a 8–3 record. As a senior, he missed time due to injury but still managed to gain 392 yards on 18 catches, scoring 5 touchdowns. In track, he finished third place in the 100 meter race at the Ventura County Championships.

He was ranked the 78th best recruit in California and the 104th receiver overall. He was given a scholarship to play for University of Washington. He spent his true freshman year as a redshirt, and did not play for their Huskies football team. In his first game the following year, Baccellia recorded two catches for 40 yards and one touchdown in the season opener against Rutgers. He made his first career start later that year, versus Portland State. He finished the season with 7 catches for 98 yards and one touchdown.

He played in just seven games as a sophomore, starting four. Baccellia finished the year with 16 catches for 187 yards. He also threw a 52-yard pass against Penn State in the Fiesta Bowl. He played in all 14 games the following year, starting five. He became more involved on offense as a junior in 2018, making 55 catches for 584 yards. As a senior, Baccellia played in all but one game, and recorded 29 receptions for 314 yards and four touchdowns.

Professional career

Kansas City Chiefs
After running a 4.28 second 40-yard dash at his college Pro Day, Baccellia was signed by the Kansas City Chiefs as an undrafted free agent following the 2020 NFL Draft. He was released near the end of preseason, as the Chiefs already had extensive depth at the wide receiver position.

New England Patriots
After being waived by the Chiefs, Baccellia was signed by the New England Patriots on August 29, only to be waived less than a week later.

Arizona Cardinals
Baccellia was signed by the Arizona Cardinals on April 15, 2021. He was waived at roster cuts and signed to the practice squad the next day. He signed a reserve/future contract with the Cardinals on January 19, 2022.

On August 30, 2022, Baccellia was waived by the Cardinals and signed to the practice squad the next day. He was promoted to the active roster on September 10, 2022. He was released ten days later and re-signed to the practice squad. In his first two games played, Baccellia recorded two receptions for 12 yards. He was signed to the active roster on October 8. He was waived on October 11 and re-signed to the practice squad. He was promoted back to the active roster on November 26, then waived and re-signed to the practice squad. He was again promoted to the active roster on December 31.

References

1997 births
Living people
People from Thousand Oaks, California
Players of American football from California
Sportspeople from Ventura County, California
American football wide receivers
Washington Huskies football players
Kansas City Chiefs players
New England Patriots players
Arizona Cardinals players